Christopher John Jelic (born December 16, 1963), is an American former Major League Baseball outfielder who appeared in four games with the New York Mets in 1990. His one career hit was a home run in the final at-bat of his career.

Amateur career
Jelic attended the University of Pittsburgh, where he not only played baseball, but also played quarterback and punter on the Pitt football team. In 1984, he played collegiate summer baseball with the Hyannis Mets of the Cape Cod Baseball League. He was selected by the Kansas City Royals in the second round of the 1985 Major League Baseball Draft.

Professional career
He was traded to the Mets with David Cone on March 27, 1987 for Rick Anderson, Mauro Gozzo and Ed Hearn. After his brief stint with the Mets in 1990, Jelic signed with the San Diego Padres, never reaching the majors in three seasons in their organization.

References

External links

1963 births
Living people
Major League Baseball outfielders
New York Mets players
Hyannis Harbor Hawks players
Baseball players from Pennsylvania
Sportspeople from Bethlehem, Pennsylvania
Pittsburgh Panthers baseball players
Pittsburgh Panthers football players
Eugene Emeralds players
Fort Myers Royals players
Jackson Mets players
Las Vegas Stars (baseball) players
Lynchburg Mets players
Tidewater Tides players
Wichita Wranglers players